Old Laurel High School is a historic former school building on Montgomery Street in Laurel, Maryland.  Built in 1899, it was the original home of Laurel High School, and now houses a community center.

Laurel High School was founded in 1899 with an enrollment of 59 students and four teachers. According to the city government, as reported by The Washington Post, the 1900 graduating class was all women. The original school building is now the Phelps Community Center in Laurel. The cupola on top was used during World War II as a Civil Defense Aircraft Spotting Station for identifying enemy aircraft. In 1965, the high school was moved to a larger building on Cherry Lane. The last class at the original location held a 50th reunion in 2015.

The building was listed on the National Register of Historic Places in 1979 as "Laurel High School".

See also
National Register of Historic Places listings in Prince George's County, Maryland

References

External links
, including photo in 2003, at Maryland Historical Trust website

Buildings and structures in Laurel, Maryland
School buildings on the National Register of Historic Places in Maryland
School buildings completed in 1899
High schools in Maryland
National Register of Historic Places in Prince George's County, Maryland
1899 establishments in Maryland